Nick Walsh (born 14 June 1984) is a former Australian rules footballer who played with Essendon in the Victorian Football League (VFL).

Walsh, a half-forward flanker, started out at St Peters in the Geelong Football League. He won the club's best and fairest award in 1985. The following year he did pre-season training with Geelong but didn't earn a place on their senior list. He instead played reserves football with Essendon in 1986 and after three games was called up into the seniors for the round 20 fixture against St Kilda at Moorabbin Oval. He was only on the field for 15 minutes and didn't appear at league level again that year. In Essendon's Panasonic Cup semi-final win over the West Coast Eagles in 1987, Walsh kicked eight goals, then a club record for a night series game. He subsequently got more opportunities in 1987, playing eight games. His other two league appearances for Essendon came in 1988.

He departed Essendon for Victorian Football Association club Werribee after the 1988 season, and played there for five seasons from 1989 to 1993, playing a total of 65 games and kicking 52 goals. He was part of the club's losing 1991 Grand Final team, and missed its 1993 premiership team with a hamstring injury. He then returned to the merged successor to his GFL junior club – Geelong West/St Peters – for three seasons before retiring from football.

References

1965 births
Australian rules footballers from Victoria (Australia)
Essendon Football Club players
Werribee Football Club players
Living people